Chodavaram, Nallajera Mandal (West) is a village located in Nallajerla Mandal of West Godavari district in Andhra Pradesh, India.

Demographics 

 Census of India, Chodavaram (West) village has population of 12,412 of which 6,198 are males and 6,214 are females. The population of children between age 0-6 is 1,324 which is 10.67% of total population. 

The sex-ratio of Chodavaram (West) village is around 1003 compared to 993 which is average of Andhra Pradesh state. The literacy rate of Chodavaram (West) village is 62% out of which 65.05% males are literate and 58.96% females are literate. There are 21.97% Scheduled Caste (SC) and 0.77% Scheduled Tribe (ST) of total population in Chodavaram (West) village.

Chodavaram (West) Population Facts

References 

Villages in West Godavari district